List of roads in Essex County may refer to:

 List of county routes in Essex County, New Jersey
 List of highways in Essex County, New York
 List of numbered roads in Essex County, Ontario